Johannes Mathias Wilhelmus Gerardus Lucassen (born 7 July 1947)  is a Dutch historian. He studied history at Leiden University and obtained his PhD at Utrecht University in 1984 with Migrant Labour in Europe 1600-1900. The Drift to the North Sea (London, 1987). He specializes in the history of labour, the long-term development of labour relations, migration and monetisation in relation to the development of wage labour.

Research
In 1988 he joined the International Institute of Social History (IISH), where he set up the research department, and was IISH's Research Director until the end of 2000. Since then, he has been a Senior Research Fellow at the IISH and an Honorary Fellow since 2012. He is a member of the Royal Netherlands Academy of Arts and Sciences since 2004. 
From 1990 until his retirement in 2012, he was Professor of International and Comparative Social History at the Vrije Universiteit Amsterdam.
Jan Lucassen is considered, together with Marcel van der Linden, as the founder of the Global Labour History approach, which advocates a worldwide perspective on the history of work and labour relations. Unlike classical labour history, Global Labour History does not focus solely on the male industrial worker in the North Atlantic region since the Industrial Revolution, but takes as its starting point the broadest possible definition of work, including domestic labour and various forms of forced labour. He is one of the principal instigators of IISH's Global Collaboratory on the History of Labour Relations, 1500-2000, in which a taxonomy of global labour relations was developed.

In 2021, he published The Story of Work: A New History of Humankind, a global history of work, from prehistoric times until the present, published by Yale University Press. The book gained positive reviews in The Economist., The Times, The Daily Telegraph, The Guardian, The New Statesman, and Financial Times. The Economist listed the book as one of the best books of 2021, while it was also mentioned as the best book of 2021 by British historian Simon Sebag Montefiore in the BBC History Magazine. In a January 2022 online public lecture and discussion at the London School of Economics, Patrick Wallis described the book 'a culmination of decades of scholarship that is turned into an incredibly engaging book that opens up [the history of work] to a wide readership'.

Publications (selection) 
 Jan Lucassen, The Story of Work: A New History of Humanity (New Haven, 2021) ; Dutch translation: De wereld aan het werk. Van de prehistorie tot nu (Zwolle, 2021) 
 Jan Lucassen, Leo Lucassen (Eds.), Globalizing Migration History: The Eurasian Experience 16th-21st centuries (Leiden and Boston, 2014) 
 Leo Lucassen en Jan Lucassen, Winnaars en verliezers. Een nuchtere balans van vijfhonderd jaar immigratie (Amsterdam, 2011, 2015) German translation: Gewinner und Verlierer. Fünf Jahrhunderte Immigration. Eine nüchterne Bilanz (Münster, 2014) 
 Jan Lucassen, Outlines of a History of Labour (Amsterdam: IISH Research Paper 2013)
 Jan Lucassen, Leo Lucassen, “From mobility transition to comparative global migration history”, in: Journal of Global History 6 (2011), pp. 299-307
 Jaap Kloosterman, Jan Lucassen, Rebels with a Cause: Five Centuries of Social History Collected by the IISH (Amsterdam, 2010) 
 Jan Lucassen, Leo Lucassen, Patrick Manning (eds), Migration History in World History: Multidisciplinary Approaches (Leiden and Boston, 2010) 
 Jan Lucassen, Leo Lucassen, “The mobility transition revisited, 1500-1900: what the case of Europe can offer to global history”, Journal of Global History 4 (2009), pp. 347-377
 Jan Lucassen, Tine De Moor, Jan Luiten van Zanden (Eds), “The Return of the Guilds”, International Review of Social History 53 (2008), Supplement 16
 Jan Lucassen (Ed.), Wages and Currency: Global Comparisons from Antiquity to the Twentieth Century (Bern 2007) 
 Albin Gladen, Antje Kraus, Piet Lourens, Jan Lucassen, Peter Schram, Helmut Talako, Gerda van Asselt (eds), Hollandgang im Spiegel der Reiseberichte evangelischer Geistlicher. Quellen zur saisonalen Arbeitswanderung in der zweiten Hälfte des 19. Jahrhunderts (Münster, 2007) 
 Jan Lucassen, “The Brickmakers’ Strikes on the Ganges Canal in 1848-1849", in: International Review of Social History 51 (2006) Supplement 14,  pp. 47-83
 Jan Lucassen (ed.), Global Labour History: A State of the Art (Bern, 2006, 2008) 
 Maarten Prak, Catharina Lis, Jan Lucassen, Hugo Soly (eds.), Craft Guilds in the Early Modern Low Countries: Work, Power and Representation (Aldershot etc., 2006) 
 Jan Lucassen (co-editor with Leo Lucassen), Migration, Migration History, History: Old Paradigms and New Perspectives (Bern, 1997, 1999, 2005) 
 Piet Lourens, Jan Lucassen, Arbeitswanderung und berufliche Spezialisierung. Die lippischen Ziegler im 18. und 19. Jahrhundert (Osnabrück, 1999)
 Marcel van der Linden, Jan Lucassen, Prolegomena for a Global Labour History (Amsterdam, 1999)
 Jan Lucassen, Rinus Penninx, Newcomers. Immigrants and their Descendants in the Netherlands 1550-1995 (Amsterdam, 1997)
 P. van Royen, J.R. Bruijn, J. Lucassen (Eds), "Those Emblems of Hell"? European Sailors and the Maritime labour Market, 1570-1870 (St. John’s, 1997)  
 K. Davids, J. Lucassen (Eds.), A Miracle Mirrored: The Dutch Republic in European Perspective (Cambridge, 1995)

References

1947 births
Living people
Utrecht University alumni
20th-century Dutch historians
Members of the Royal Netherlands Academy of Arts and Sciences
21st-century Dutch historians
Labor historians
Leiden University alumni
21st-century Dutch male writers
20th-century Dutch male writers